The 2016 Australian Open was a tennis tournament that took place at Melbourne Park between 18 and 31 January 2016. It was the 104th edition of the Australian Open, and the first Grand Slam tournament of the year. The tournament consisted of events for professional players in singles, doubles and mixed doubles play. Junior and wheelchair players competed in singles and doubles tournaments.

Novak Djokovic successfully defended the men's singles title and thus won a record-equaling sixth Australian Open title. Serena Williams was the defending champion in the women's singles but failed to defend her title, losing to Angelique Kerber in the final; by winning, Kerber became the first German player of any gender to win a Grand Slam title since Steffi Graf won her last such title at the 1999 French Open.

As in previous years, this year's tournament's title sponsor was Kia. This edition set a new attendance record for the tournament of 720,363.

Tournament

The 2016 Australian Open was the 104th edition of the tournament and was held at Melbourne Park in Melbourne, Victoria, Australia.

The tournament was run by the International Tennis Federation (ITF) and was part of the 2016 ATP World Tour and the 2016 WTA Tour calendars under the Grand Slam category. The tournament consisted of both men's and women's singles and doubles draws as well as a mixed doubles event. There were singles and doubles events for both boys and girls (players under 18), which was part of the Grade A category of tournaments, and also singles, doubles and quad events for men's and women's wheelchair tennis players as part of the NEC tour under the Grand Slam category.

The tournament was played on hard courts and take place over a series of 25 courts, including the three main show courts: Rod Laver Arena, Hisense Arena and Margaret Court Arena.

Broadcast
In Australia, selected key matches were broadcast live by the Seven Network. The majority of matches were shown on the network's primary channel Channel Seven, however during news programming nationwide and most night matches in Perth, coverage shifted to either 7Two or 7mate. Additionally, every match was also available to be streamed live through a free 7Tennis mobile app.

Internationally, ESPN held the rights for America and Central America, broadcasting matches on ESPN2 and ESPN3 in the United States as well as regionally on ESPN International.  ESPN also sub-licenses matches to Tennis Channel. Other broadcasters included beIN Sports in the Middle East, SuperSport in Africa, Eurosport through Europe (plus NOS Netherlands and SRG SSR in Switzerland), CCTV, iQiyi and SMG in China, Fiji One in Fiji, Sony ESPN in India, both Wowow and NHK in Japan, Sky in New Zealand and Fox Sports Asia in selected markets in the Asia Pacific region. In Canada, TSN broadcast matches across multiple channels.

Events

Spectator safety
Spectator safety became a major issue during the tournament, with up to four separate cases reported:
On Day 2, play was suspended during the fourth set of Bernard Tomic's first round match against Denis Istomin for 20 minutes after an elderly spectator collapsed due to heat stress; she was subsequently treated with an EpiPen and taken away from Hisense Arena.
On Day 4, Ana Ivanovic's second round match against Anastasija Sevastova was interrupted in the first set when another elderly spectator fell down a set of stairs, delaying play by 25 minutes.
On Day 6, in the most serious case, Ivanovic was again involved in a match that had to be suspended, after her coach Nigel Sears suffered a heart attack during the second set of her match against Madison Keys. Sears, who is the father-in-law of Andy Murray, had to be stretchered out of the stands and play on Rod Laver Arena was suspended for an hour. Having led by a set and a break at the time, Ivanovic proceeded to lose the match in three sets. Sears was later taken to hospital where he eventually made a full recovery.
On Day 7, Sam Groth's mother fell down a set of stairs on Hisense Arena during the second set of her son and Lleyton Hewitt's doubles match against Jack Sock and Vasek Pospisil, causing play to be suspended by 20 minutes. She was later able to walk out of the court unassisted.

Maria Sharapova doping controversy
On 7 March 2016, five weeks after the conclusion of the tournament, world number seven Maria Sharapova announced at a press conference in Los Angeles that she had failed a drug test following her quarter-final defeat by Serena Williams on 26 January. Sharapova confessed to taking the substance meldonium, which was placed on the World Anti-Doping Agency's list of banned substances on 1 January; she was later suspended for two years (later reduced to fifteen months on appeal), backdated to 26 January, and was subsequently docked the $A375,000 she earned for reaching the quarter-finals.

Point and prize money distribution

Point distribution
Below is a series of tables for each of the competitions showing the ranking points on offer for each event.

Senior points

Wheelchair points

Junior points

Prize money
The Australian Open total prize money for 2016 was increased by four million Australian dollars to tournament record A$44,000,000.

1Qualifiers prize money was also the Round of 128 prize money.
*per team

Singles players
2016 Australian Open – Men's singles

2016 Australian Open – Women's singles

Day-by-day summaries

Champions

Seniors

Men's singles

  Novak Djokovic defeated  Andy Murray, 6–1, 7–5, 7–6(7–3)
Djokovic and Murray had faced one another 30 times prior to the final, with Djokovic victorious on 21 occasions.  Murray had lost four Australian Open finals, three times to Djokovic, while the Serb had won the title five times.  After an even first game, Djokovic broke Murray twice to lead 5–0, before Murray held.  Djokovic took the winning game to secure the first set 6–1 in 30 minutes.  The second set went with serve until Djokovic broke Murray to lead 4–3.  The Scot broke back immediately and held his serve, but Djokovic broke in the eleventh game, then went on to hold serve, taking the second set 7–5.  Djokovic broke the Murray serve in the first game of the third set, but Murray broke back to restore parity in the set at 3–3.  The subsequent games went with serve and sent the set to a tie-break.  Djokovic led 3–0 and 6–1 before finally securing the championship victory by three sets to love, with a 7–3 tie-break victory.

Women's singles

  Angelique Kerber defeated  Serena Williams, 6–4, 3–6, 6–4

Going into the final, Kerber and Williams had faced each other six times with Williams holding a 5–1 advantage.  Kerber broke Williams in the third game of the first set with Williams breaking back to make it 3–3.   Kerber immediately broke back and held serve to win the first set 6–4.  Williams took advantage of the third of three break points in the fourth game of the second set, the remainder of the set going with serve, leveling the match at one set all.  Kerber broke Williams in the second game of the final set, but Williams immediately broke back and held her own serve to level the deciding set at 2–2.   Another break for Kerber saw her leading 5–2 but Williams broke back once again, taking the set to 5–4 to Kerber.  A cross-court exchange described as "breathtaking" saw Williams hit the ball long, securing the title for Kerber.

Men's doubles

  Jamie Murray /  Bruno Soares defeated  Daniel Nestor /  Radek Štěpánek, 2–6, 6–4, 7–5

Women's doubles

  Martina Hingis /  Sania Mirza defeated  Andrea Hlaváčková /  Lucie Hradecká, 7–6(7–1), 6–3

Mixed doubles

  Elena Vesnina /  Bruno Soares defeated  CoCo Vandeweghe /  Horia Tecău, 6–4, 4–6, [10–5]

Juniors

Boys' singles

  Oliver Anderson defeated  Jurabek Karimov, 6–2, 1–6, 6–1

Girls' singles

  Vera Lapko defeated  Tereza Mihalíková, 6–3, 6–4

Boys' doubles

  Alex de Minaur /  Blake Ellis defeated  Lukáš Klein /  Patrik Rikl, 3–6, 7–5, [12–10]

Girls' doubles

  Anna Kalinskaya /  Tereza Mihalíková defeated  Dayana Yastremska /  Anastasia Zarytska, 6–1, 6–1

Legends

Men's Legends doubles

  Jonas Björkman /  Thomas Johansson defeated  Thomas Enqvist /  Magnus Norman, 4–3(5–4), 1–4, 4–3(5–3)

Wheelchair events

Wheelchair men's singles

  Gordon Reid defeated  Joachim Gérard, 7–6(9–7), 6–4

Wheelchair women's singles

  Jiske Griffioen defeated  Aniek van Koot, 6–3, 7–5

Wheelchair quad singles

  Dylan Alcott defeated  David Wagner, 6–2, 6–2

Wheelchair men's doubles

  Stéphane Houdet /  Nicolas Peifer defeated  Gordon Reid /  Shingo Kunieda, 6–3, 3–6, 7–5

Wheelchair women's doubles

  Marjolein Buis /  Yui Kamiji defeated  Jiske Griffioen /  Aniek van Koot, 6–2, 6–2

Wheelchair quad doubles

  Lucas Sithole /  David Wagner defeated  Dylan Alcott /  Andrew Lapthorne, 6–1, 6–3

Singles seeds
The following are the seeded players and notable players who withdrew from the event. Seeding are arranged according to ATP and WTA rankings on 11 January 2016, while ranking and points before are as of 18 January 2016.

Men's singles

The following player would have been seeded, but he withdrew from the event.

Women's singles

The following players would have been seeded, but they withdrew or not entered from the event.

Doubles seeds

Men's doubles

1 Rankings were as of 11 January 2016.

Women's doubles

 
 1 Rankings were as of 11 January 2016.

Mixed doubles

 1 Rankings were as of 18 January 2016.

Main draw wildcard entries

Men's singles
  James Duckworth
  Matthew Ebden
  Quentin Halys
  Lleyton Hewitt
  Omar Jasika
  Yoshihito Nishioka
  Noah Rubin
  Jordan Thompson

Women's singles
  Kimberly Birrell
  Samantha Crawford
  Océane Dodin
  Han Xinyun
  Priscilla Hon
  Maddison Inglis
  Tammi Patterson
  Storm Sanders

Men's doubles
  Alex Bolt /  Andrew Whittington
  James Duckworth /  John Millman
  Sam Groth /  Lleyton Hewitt
  Hsieh Cheng-peng /  Yang Tsung-hua
  Omar Jasika /  Nick Kyrgios
  Austin Krajicek /  Donald Young
  Luke Saville /  John-Patrick Smith

Women's doubles
  Shuko Aoyama /  Makoto Ninomiya
  Alison Bai /  Naiktha Bains
  Kimberly Birrell /  Priscilla Hon
  Daniela Hantuchová /  Jarmila Wolfe (withdrew)
  Jessica Moore /  Storm Sanders
  Tammi Patterson /  Olivia Rogowska
  Ellen Perez /  Belinda Woolcock

Mixed doubles
  Kimberly Birrell /  John Millman
  Daria Gavrilova /  Luke Saville
  Maddison Inglis /  Benjamin Mitchell
  Jessica Moore /  Marc Polmans
  Anastasia Rodionova /  Chris Guccione
  Arina Rodionova /  Matt Reid
  Ajla Tomljanović /  Nick Kyrgios
  Zheng Saisai /  Chung Hyeon

Main draw qualifier entries
The qualifying competition took place in Melbourne Park on 13 – 16 January 2016.

Men's singles

  Daniel Evans
  Jozef Kovalík
  Tim Smyczek
  Wu Di
  Radek Štěpánek
  Mirza Bašić
  Ryan Harrison
  Peter Gojowczyk
  Taylor Fritz
  Daniel Brands
  Pierre-Hugues Herbert
  Yūichi Sugita
  Tatsuma Ito
  Stéphane Robert
  Marco Trungelliti
  Renzo Olivo

Lucky loser
  Bjorn Fratangelo

Women's singles

  Wang Qiang
  Nicole Gibbs
  Wang Yafan
  Naomi Osaka
  Anastasija Sevastova
  Zhang Shuai
  Kristýna Plíšková
  Viktorija Golubic
  Luksika Kumkhum
  Maryna Zanevska
  Maria Sakkari
  Tamira Paszek

Protected ranking
The following players were accepted directly into the main draw using a protected ranking:

 Men's singles
  Brian Baker (PR 56)
  Julien Benneteau (PR 39)
  Dmitry Tursunov (PR 89)

 Women's singles
  Petra Cetkovská (PR 54)
  Vania King (PR 73)

Withdrawals 
The following players were accepted directly into the main tournament, but withdrew with injuries and personal reasons.
Before the tournament

 Men's singles
  Richard Gasquet → replaced by  Kyle Edmund
  Tommy Haas → replaced by  Nikoloz Basilashvili
  Andreas Haider-Maurer → replaced by  Austin Krajicek
  Thanasi Kokkinakis → replaced by  Filip Krajinović
  Lu Yen-hsun → replaced by  Bjorn Fratangelo
  Juan Mónaco → replaced by  Dudi Sela
  Janko Tipsarević → replaced by  Malek Jaziri

 Women's singles
  Alisa Kleybanova → replaced by  Elizaveta Kulichkova
  Karin Knapp → replaced by  Aliaksandra Sasnovich
  Flavia Pennetta → replaced by  Donna Vekić
  Lucie Šafářová → replaced by  Jarmila Wolfe
  Galina Voskoboeva → replaced by  Kiki Bertens

Retirements 

 Men's singles
  Kevin Anderson
  Ivo Karlović
  Filip Krajinović
  Sam Querrey
  Dmitry Tursunov

 Women's singles
  Mariana Duque Mariño
  Elizaveta Kulichkova
  Magdaléna Rybáriková
  Jarmila Wolfe

References

External links

 Australian Open official website